Dalea carthagenensis is a species of flowering plant in the legume family known by the common name Cartagena prairie-clover. It is native to the Americas, where it is found in South America, Central America, the West Indies, and the US state of Florida.

There are several varieties, including:
Dalea carthagenensis var. barbata - Mexico, Costa Rica, El Salvador, Guatemala, Honduras, Nicaragua, Panama, Colombia
Dalea carthagenensis var. carthagenensis - Hispaniola, Curacao, United States Virgin Islands, Venezuela, Colombia
Dalea carthagenensis var. floridana - Florida
Dalea carthagenensis var. portoricana - Puerto Rico

References

External links
USDA Plants Profile

carthagenensis
Flora of the Caribbean
Flora of Central America
Flora of South America
Flora of Florida